Multi-user MIMO (MU-MIMO) is a set of multiple-input and multiple-output (MIMO) technologies for multipath wireless communication, in which multiple users or terminals, each radioing over one or more antennas, communicate with one another. In contrast, single-user MIMO (SU-MIMO) involves a single multi-antenna-equipped user or terminal communicating with precisely one other similarly equipped node. Analogous to how OFDMA adds multiple-access capability to OFDM in the cellular-communications realm, MU-MIMO adds multiple-user capability to MIMO in the wireless realm.

SDMA, massive MIMO, coordinated multipoint (CoMP), and ad hoc MIMO are all related to MU-MIMO; each of those technologies often leverage spatial degrees of freedom to separate users.

Technology
MU-MIMO leverages multiple users as spatially distributed transmission resources, at the cost of somewhat more expensive signal processing.  In comparison, conventional single-user MIMO (SU-MIMO) involves solely local-device multiple-antenna dimensions. MU-MIMO algorithms enhance MIMO systems where connections among users count greater than one. MU-MIMO may be generalized into two categories: MIMO broadcast channels (MIMO BC) and MIMO multiple-access channels (MIMO MAC) for downlink and uplink situations, respectively. Again in comparison, SU-MIMO may be represented as a point-to-point, pairwise MIMO.

To remove ambiguity of the words receiver and transmitter, we can adopt the terms access point (AP) or base station, and user. An AP is the transmitter and a user the receiver for downlink connections, and vice versa for uplink connections. Homogeneous networks are freed from this distinction since they tend to be bi-directional.

MIMO broadcast (MIMO BC)

MIMO BC represents a MIMO downlink case where a single sender transmits to multiple receivers within the wireless network. Examples of advanced-transmit processing for MIMO BC are interference-aware precoding and SDMA-based downlink user scheduling. For advanced-transmit processing, qfz has to be known at the transmitter (CSIT). That is, knowledge of CSIT allows throughput improvement, and methods to obtain CSIT become of significant importance. MIMO BC systems have an outstanding advantage over point-to-point SU-MIMO systems, especially when the number of antennas at the transmitter, or AP, is larger than the number of antennas at each receiver (user).  The categories of precoding techniques which may be used by MIMO BC include, one, those using dirty paper coding (DPC) and linear techniques and two, hybrid (analog and digital) techniques.

MIMO MAC
Conversely, the MIMO multiple-access-channel or MIMO MAC represents a MIMO uplink case in the multiple sender to single receiver wireless network. Examples of advanced receive processing for MIMO MAC are joint interference cancellation and SDMA-based uplink user scheduling. For advanced receive processing, the receiver has to know the channel state information at the receiver (CSIR). Knowing CSIR is generally easier than knowing CSIT. However, knowing CSIR costs a lot of uplink resources to transmit dedicated pilots from each user to the AP. MIMO MAC systems outperforms point-to-point MIMO systems especially when the number of receiver antennas at an AP is larger than the number of transmit antennas at each user.

Cross-layer MIMO
Cross-layer MIMO enhances the performance of MIMO links by solving certain cross-layer problems that may occur when MIMO configurations are employed in a system. Cross-layer techniques can be used to enhance the performance of SISO links as well. Examples of cross-layer techniques are Joint Source-Channel Coding, Adaptive Modulation and Coding (AMC, or "Link Adaptation"), Hybrid ARQ (HARQ), and user scheduling.

Multi-user to multi-user
The highly interconnected wireless ad hoc network increases the flexibility of wireless networking at the cost of increased multi-user interference. To improve the interference immunity, PHY/MAC-layer protocols have evolved from competition based to cooperative based transmission and reception. Cooperative wireless communications can actually exploit interference, which includes self-interference and other user interference. In cooperative wireless communications, each node might use self-interference and other user interference to improve the performance of data encoding and decoding, whereas conventional nodes are generally directed to avoid the interference. For example, once strong interference is decodable, a node decodes and cancels the strong interference before decoding the self-signal.  The mitigation of low carrier-over-interference (CoI) ratios can be implemented across PHY/MAC/Application network layers in cooperative systems.

 Cooperative multiple antenna research – Apply multiple antenna technologies in situations with antennas distributed among neighboring wireless terminals.
 Cooperative diversity – Achieve antenna diversity gain by the cooperation of distributed antennas belonging to each independent node.
 Cooperative MIMO – Achieve MIMO advantages, including the spatial multiplexing gain, using the transmit or receiver cooperation of distributed antennas belonging to many different nodes.
 Cooperative relay – Apply cooperative concepts onto relay techniques, which is similar to cooperative diversity in terms of cooperative signalling. However, the main criterion of cooperative relay is to improve the tradeoff region between delay and performance, while that of cooperative diversity and MIMO is to improve the link and system performance at the expense of minimal cooperation loss.
 Relaying techniques for cooperation
 Store-and-forward (S&F), amplify-and-forward (A&F), decode-and-forward (D&F), coded cooperation, spatial coded cooperation, compress-and-forward (C&F), non-orthogonal methods

Cooperative MIMO (CO-MIMO) 

CO-MIMO, also known as network MIMO (net-MIMO), or ad hoc MIMO, uses distributed antennas which belong to other users, while conventional MIMO, i.e., single-user MIMO, only employs antennas belonging to the local terminal. CO-MIMO improves the performance of a wireless network by introducing multiple antenna advantages, such as diversity, multiplexing and beamforming. If the main interest hinges on the diversity gain, it is known as cooperative diversity. It can be described as a form of macro-diversity, used for example in soft handover. Cooperative MIMO corresponds to transmitter macro-diversity or simulcasting. A simple form that does not require any advanced signal processing is single frequency networks (SFN), used especially in wireless broadcasting. SFNs combined with channel adaptive or traffic adaptive scheduling is called dynamic single frequency networks (DSFN).

CO-MIMO is a technique useful for future cellular networks which consider wireless mesh networking or wireless ad hoc networking. In wireless ad hoc networks, multiple transmit nodes communicate with multiple receive nodes. To optimize the capacity of ad hoc channels, MIMO concepts and techniques can be applied to multiple links between the transmit and receive node clusters. Contrasted to multiple antennas in a single-user MIMO transceiver, participating nodes and their antennas are located in a distributed manner. So, to achieve the capacity of this network, techniques to manage distributed radio resources are essential.  Strategies such as autonomous interference cognition, node cooperation, and network coding with dirty paper coding have been suggested to optimize wireless network capacity.

See also 

 Distributed antenna system
 Mesh network
 Mobile ad hoc network
 Phased array
 Space-division multiple access 
 Space-time coding/processing

References

External links 
MU-MIMO Beamforming by Constructive Interference, Wolfram Demonstrations Project
 Peel, C. B., Spencer, Q. H., Swindlehurst, A. L., & Haardt, M. (2004). An introduction to the multi-user MIMO downlink. IEEE communications Magazine, 61.

Information theory
Radio resource management